Rafael Rebello (born October 16, 1980) is a Brazilian mixed martial artist who formerly competed in the bantamweight division for the World Extreme Cagefighting, and now currently competes in the bantamweight division of Fight Time Promotions.  Rafael trains with the fighting stable American Top Team and is the Head Trainer at American Top Team Deerfield Beach.

Mixed martial arts career

Pacific X-treme Combat
Rebello made his PXC debut at PXC 12 - Settling the Score, defeating Jeff Willingham via Submission (Punches).

He continued with a win over Roger Mai via Submission (Armbar) at PXC 13 - Back from the Dead.

Rebello defeated David Cho via Unanimous Decision at PXC 26 - Meanest Game Face on August 20, 2011.

World Extreme Cagefighting
Rebello made his WEC debut at WEC 39, losing to Kenji Osawa via split decision.

He followed this up with a victory over Kyle Dietz via submission (rear naked choke).

He was then scheduled to fight Scott Jorgensen on October 10, 2009 at WEC 43. However, he was forced to pull out due to an injury.

Rebello was expected to face Will Campuzano on June 20, 2010 at WEC 49, but instead faced WEC newcomer Chris Cariaso. Rebello lost the fight via unanimous decision.

Fight Time Promotions
Rebello made his Fight Time debut on February 17, 2012 at Fight Time 8 - "It's Fight Time!" against Jim Chaikong with a first round rear-naked choke submission win.

Battle Xtreme Championships
Rebello made his BXC debut on June 16, 2012 at BXC - The Rise against Bobby Huron with a second round arm-triangle choke win.

Mixed martial arts record

|-
|Win
|align=center|9–4
|Bobby Huron
|Submission (arm-triangle choke)
|BXC - The Rise
|
|align=center|2
|align=center|3:59
|Springfield, Massachusetts, United States
|
|-
|Win
|align=center|8–4
|Jimmy Chaikong
|Submission (rear naked choke)
|Fight Time 8 - "It's Fight Time!"
|
|align=center|1
|align=center|3:50
|Fort Lauderdale, Florida, United States
|
|-
|Win
|align=center|7–4
|David Cho
|Decision (unanimous)
|PXC 26 - Meanest Game Face
|
|align=center|3
|align=center|5:00
|Manila, Philippines
|
|-
|Loss
|align=center|6–4
|Chris Cariaso
|Decision (unanimous)
|WEC 49
|
|align=center|3
|align=center|5:00
|Edmonton, Alberta, Canada
|
|-
|Win
|align=center|6–3
|Kyle Dietz
|Submission (rear-naked choke)
|WEC 41
|
|align=center|1
|align=center|2:55
|Sacramento, California, United States
|
|-
|Loss
|align=center|5–3
|Kenji Osawa
|Decision (split)
|WEC 39
|
|align=center|3
|align=center|5:00
|Corpus Christi, Texas, United States
|
|-
|Win
|align=center|5–2
|Roger Mai
|Submission (armbar)
|PXC 13 - Back from the Dead
|
|align=center|1
|align=center|N/A
|Mangilao, Guam
|
|-
|Win
|align=center|4–2
|Jeff Willingham
|Submission (punches)
|PXC 12 - Settling the Score
|
|align=center|1
|align=center|
|Orlando, Florida, United States
|
|-
|Win
|align=center|3–2
|Taro Ito
|Submission (armbar)
|CFC 4 - Combat Fighting Championships
|
|align=center|1
|align=center|2:51
|Brazil
|
|-
|Win
|align=center|2–2
|Henrique Bilcalho
|TKO (corner stoppage)
|WFL 15 - Winter Brawl 2007
|
|align=center|2
|align=center|4:00
|Revere, Massachusetts, United States
|
|-
|Loss
|align=center|1–2
|Bill Boland
|Decision (majority)
|IC 11 - Apocalypse
|
|align=center|2
|align=center|N/A
|Hammond, Indiana, United States
|
|-
|Win
|align=center|1–1
|Paul Gorman
|Decision (majority)
|FFP - Untamed 6
|
|align=center|3
|align=center|5:00
|Brockton, Massachusetts, United States
|
|-
|Loss
|align=center|0–1
|Matt Hamilton
|Decision (majority)
|AFC 12 - Absolute Fighting Championships 12
|
|align=center|2
|align=center|5:00
|Fort Lauderdale, Florida, United States
|

References

External links 

Rafael Rebello & American Top Team Deerfield Beach

Brazilian male mixed martial artists
Bantamweight mixed martial artists
Mixed martial artists utilizing Brazilian jiu-jitsu
Sportspeople from Niterói
Brazilian expatriate sportspeople in the United States
Brazilian practitioners of Brazilian jiu-jitsu
People awarded a black belt in Brazilian jiu-jitsu
1980 births
Living people
People from Coconut Creek, Florida